Síragon, C.A. is a Venezuelan manufacturer and assembler of computer hardware and other electronic products such as digital cameras, tablet computers and LCD televisions. Siragon also designs and manufactures its own RAM and flash memory and printed circuit boards. The company was created in an alliance between Venezuelan and Japanese investors. Its plant is located in the North Industrial Zone of Valencia, Carabobo.

In November 2009, Síragon started to distribute its product line in Argentina, Allied with the Argentinian computer wholesale vendor  Greentech. Síragon manufactures its own designs and also builds under license, all-in-one computers from Brazilian Itautec.

Siragon products are all manufactured in Venezuela. At the 2012 international consumer electronics show Siragon formally announced its intent to enter the US market by the end of 2012. Siragon is engaged in a design partnership with BMW for which it both manufactures electronics for and collaborates on electronic designs with.

Siragon currently holds the third largest share of the electronics market in Venezuela.

Products 

Digital cameras
Video cameras
Desktop computers
Laptop computers
Netbooks
Computer servers
LCD televisions and monitors
LED television
Plasma TV screens
Sound systems
Peripherals
Tablet computers

References

External links
Síragon Webpage 

Electronics companies of Venezuela
Venezuelan brands
Computer hardware companies
Computer memory companies
Display technology companies
Netbook manufacturers
Home appliance manufacturers
Electronics companies established in 2004
2004 establishments in Venezuela